Spec Towns Track is the track and field facility and stadium for the University of Georgia (UGA) in Athens, Georgia.  The track was originally built in 1964 and the stadium grandstand was added in 1987 to accommodate 1,000 spectators. In 2011, the Bulldogs hosted their first Southeastern Conference Outdoor Track & Field Championships since 1999 at the Spec Towns Track. Following the 2017 track season, the track was upgraded to a 400-meter, 8-lane Mondo Sportflex Super X720 surface (the same surface used at every Summer Olympics since 1992), replacing the old polyurethane track.

The track was named after Spec Towns in 1990 during the SEC outdoor Track and Field championships.

The University of Georgia holds the Spec Towns Invitational in early April each year, a track meet recognizing his achievements and contributions to the school.

References 
 
 
 

Sports venues in Georgia (U.S. state)
University of Georgia campus
Athletics (track and field) venues in Georgia (U.S. state)
College track and field venues in the United States
1964 establishments in Georgia (U.S. state)
Sports venues completed in 1964